Indrajith is a 1989 Indian Kannada-language film directed and written by K. V. Raju. The film stars Ambareesh and Deepika, with Devaraj, Shashikumar and Keerthi in supporting roles. The music and lyrics of the film were composed and written by Hamsalekha.

Plot 
Indrajith, an honest cop, is betrayed, accused of bribery and thrown behind the bars when he investigates a high-profile case related to an influential gangster. Upon release, he reunites with his wife and his son (who has been brought up by an old friend). He teams up with Fernandez, a handicapped police informant and a betrayed ex-cop, and develops an army of youngsters to battle corruption and seek revenge.

Cast 
 Ambareesh as Indrajith
 Deepika 
 Devaraj as Fernandis 
 Shashikumar
 Mukhyamantri Chandru
 Doddanna
 Lohitashwa
 Keerthi
 Disco Shanti
Sathyajith 
Rama murthy 
Rajaram. H. S.

Production
Actor Devaraj explained in a later interview that, while the first three films in which he had roles were never released, his role as a police officer in the film Indrajith paved the way for his career in later films.

Soundtrack 
The music was composed and lyrics written by Hamsalekha. The love duet song "Belli Rathadali" was immensely popular and considered one of the evergreen songs.

References 

1989 films
1980s Kannada-language films
Indian action films
Films scored by Hamsalekha
1989 action films